

Satanism and Witchcraft is a book by Jules Michelet on the history of witchcraft. Originally published in Paris as La Sorcière in 1862, the first English translation appeared in London a year later.

Views
According to Michelet, medieval witchcraft was an act of popular rebellion against the oppression of feudalism and the Roman Catholic Church. This rebellion took the form of a secret religion inspired by paganism and fairy beliefs, organized by a woman who became its leader. The participants in the secret religion met regularly at the witches' sabbath and the Black Mass. Michelet's account is openly sympathetic to the sufferings of peasants and women in the Middle Ages. Michelet’s authority on the history of the Middle Ages, and insistence that history should concentrate on ‘the people, and not only its leaders or its institutions’ placed him ahead of his time as a godfather of micro-history. Michelet was one of the first few people to attempt to show the sociological explanation of the Witch Trials. He does so similarly to his follower, Margaret Murray, in interpreting the source material very literally.

According to Michelet, in a note added to the end of the book:

Structure
The first part of the book is an imaginative reconstruction of the experience of a series of witches who led the religion from its original form of social protest into decadence. The second part is a series of episodes in the European witch trials. Today the book is regarded as being largely inaccurate, but still notable for being one of the first sympathetic histories of witchcraft, and as such it may have had an indirect influence on Wicca. He uses a very popular style of writing that makes the book all the more bearable to read. Had he done it in a more academic style it would perhaps be more widely regarded as a reputable study. The book and the stories told within are told with the energy and style that one might use when telling stories around a campfire as opposed to the air one might use in a lecture.

Media
In the early 1970s, La Sorcière became the basis for Alain Robbe-Grillet's film Glissements progressifs du plaisir (starring Jean-Louis Trintignant) and the anime film Kanashimi no Belladonna, by Mushi Production.

See also
 Aradia, or the Gospel of the Witches
 Dianic Wicca

References

External links
 The full French text (various formats)
 The full French text, with internal links and pictures (MS Word format)
 Full text of "La Sorcière: The Witch in the Middle Ages" (1863 English translation)
  English translation
 Illustrations by Martin van Maële from 1911 edition

Further reading
 English translation: Satanism and Witchcraft: A Study in Medieval Superstition. Transl. A. R. Allinson. Lyle Stuart/Citadel Press, 1939.
 La Sorcière de Jules Michelet: l'envers de l'histoire, ed. Paule Petitier. Paris, Champion, 2004.

1862 non-fiction books
19th-century history books
History books about the Middle Ages
History books about witchcraft
Occult books
European witchcraft
Satanism
Non-fiction books adapted into films